Prodoxus intricatus is a moth of the family Prodoxidae. It is found in Mexico in Veracruz and Oaxaca.

The wingspan is 13–16 mm. The forewings are dark brown with a violet sheen and about five to eight yellow spots. The hindwings are uniform brown.

The larvae feed on Yucca elephantipes. They probably bore in the floral rachis of their host plant.

References

Moths described in 1893
Prodoxidae
Moths of Central America